The 1986 Ohio Bobcats football team was an American football team that represented Ohio University in the Mid-American Conference (MAC) during the 1986 NCAA Division I-A football season. In their second season under head coach Cleve Bryant, the Bobcats compiled a 1–10 record (0–8 against MAC opponents), finished in last place in the MAC, and were outscored by all opponents by a combined total of 329 to 196.  They played their home games in Peden Stadium in Athens, Ohio.

Schedule

References

Ohio
Ohio Bobcats football seasons
Ohio Bobcats football